This is a list of Mexican football transfers in the Mexican Primera División during the summer 2006-07 transfer window, grouped by club.

Club América 

In:
  Nelson Cuevas  Transferred From C.F. Pachuca
 Salvador Cabañas - Transferred From Chiapas
 Fabián Peña - out retirement
 Vicente Matías VuosoLoaned FromSantos Laguna'
 Sithuma Zuma - Return From Arminia Biedfield
 Hugo Ibarra Return From Boca Juniors
 Gabriel Pereyra - Transferred From CF Atlante
 Mario Rodriguez - Transferred From Club Atlas

Out:
 R - Transferred To Blackburn
 ' - Transferred To C.F. Monterrey
 ' - Loaned To B.Dortmund
 ' - Loaned To C.F. Pachuca
 ' - Loaned To LA Galaxy
 ' - Transferred To Manchester United
 ' - Transferred To Barcelona

Atlante F.C. 

In:
 Octavio Valdez - Loaned From San Luis
 Israel López - Loaned From Cruz Azul
 Rafael Medina - Loaned From CD Veracruz
 Ariel Gonzalez - Loaned From CD Veracruz
 Alfonso Blanco - Loaned From C.F. Pachuca

Out:
 Daniel Alcantar - On Loan To CF Recreativo
 Olguin - On Loan To Monarcas Morelia
 Gabriel Pereyra - On Loan To Club América
 Herrera - On Loan  To Toluca
 Edwin Borboa - Sold To C.F. Pachuca
 Gerardo Ruiz - On Loan To San Luis
 Federico Vilar - Sold To FC Colonia

Club Atlas 

In:
 Hugo Rodallega - on Loan From C.F. Monterrey
 Mario Rodríguez - on Loan From Tecos UAG
 Denis Caniza - Transferred From Cruz Azul
 Cesar Pereyra - Transferred From Independiente
 Mauricio Romero - Return From Monarcas Morelia

Out:
 Danilo Vergne - Transferred To Cruz Azul
 Marcelo Macedo - Released
 Rafael Garcia - Return Cruz Azul
 Ulises Mendivil - Transferred To Chiapas
 Sergio Orteman - Return To Independiente

Guadalajara 

In:
  Juan Pablo Rodríguez - Transferred From Tecos UAG
Out:  
  Edoardo Isella - On Loan To Jaguares de Chiapas
  Christian Armas - On LoanTo Jaguares de Chiapas
  Alejandro Vela - On Loan To Jaguares de Chiapas
  Carlos Salcido - Transferred To PSV Eindhoven
  Johnny Garcia - Transferred To C.D Chivas U.S.A. 
  Jorge Barrera - Transferred To Querétaro F.C.

Cruz Azul 

In:
  Israel López - Transferred From Club Toluca
  Danilo Vergne - On Loan From Atlas
  Javier Campora - Transferred from Tiro Federal
  Richard Núñez - Return from Pachuca
  Héctor López - Transferred from Dorados
  José Antonio Hernández - Return from Necaxa
Out:
  Javier Restrepo -  To Tigres UANL
  Tomas Campos - On Loan To Tigres UANL
  Ricardo Osorio - Transferred To VfB Stuttgart
  Denis Caniza - Transferred To Atlas
  Aaron Galindo - Transferred To Hércules CF
  Francisco Fonseca - Transferred To Benfica
  Alejandro Corona - Transferred To Jaguares de Chiapas

Chiapas 

In:
  Alejandro Vela - Transferred From Guadalajara
  Christian Armas - Transferred From Guadalajara
  Oscar E. Rojas - On Loan From CD Veracruz
  Ulises Mendivil - Transferred From Atlas
  Alejandro Corona - Transferred From Cruz Azul
  Leonardo Medina - Transferred From Liverpool de Uruguay
  Herly Alcázar - Transferred From Universidad de Chile
  Javier Saavedra - On Loan From Tigres UANL
Out:
 Carlos Ochoa - Transferred To C.F. Monterrey
 Salvador Cabañas - Transferred To Club América
 Walter Jiménez - Transferred To Santos Laguna
 Alex Diego - Return To UNAM
 Erubey Cabuto - Transferred To CF Querétaro
 Omar Rodríguez - Transferred To N.A.
 Lucas Sparapani - Transferred To N.A.
 Adrián García Arias - Transferred To San Luis
 Alvaro Sarabia - Transferred To N.A.
 Omar Perez - Transferred To Atlético Junior

Monarcas Morelia 

In:
  Hector Altamirano on loan From Santos Laguna
  Andres Orozco transfer From Dorados de Sinaloa
  Walter Montillo transfer From San Lorenzo
  José Luis Villanueva transfer From Racing Club de Avellaneda
Out:
  Nestor Silvera transfer From UANL Tigres cancelled
  Iván Moreno y Fabinesi transfer To Vélez Sársfield
  Cristian Nasuti transfer To River Plate
  Damian Ariel Álvarez transfer To Pachuca

C.F. Monterrey 

In:
  Sebastián Abreu transferred from Dorados de Sinaloa
  Carlos Ochoa transferred from Jaguares de Chiapas
  Diego Ramírez on loan from CF Atlante
  Leandro Gracián transferred from Vélez Sársfield

Out:
  Reinaldo Navia released
  Oribe Peralta on loan to Santos Laguna
  Hugo Rodallega on loan to Atlas
  Mario Méndez transferred to Tigres

Necaxa 

In:
 Kléber Boas on loan From Club América
 Aarón Padilla on loan From Club América
 Joaquin Beltranon loan From UNAM
 Gerardo Galindo transferred From UNAM
 Osvaldo Lucas transferred From CF Atlante
 Victor Gutierrez transferred From Cruz Azul
 Nicolas Olivera transferred From Defensor Sporting

Out:
 Rodolfo Espinoza loaned To CF Atlante
 Ariel López loaned To UNAM Pumas
 Tressor Moreno transferred To CD Veracruz

C.F. Pachuca 

In:
  Christian Giménez Transferred From Club América
  Damian Ariel Álvarez Transferred From Monarcas Morelia
Out:
  Nelson Cuevas Return To Club América

Querétaro F.C. 

In:
  Jorge Collazo Transferred From Atlante F.C.
  Roberto Nurse Transferred From Atlante F.C.
  Erubey Cabuto Transferred From Jaguares de Chiapas
  Alejandro Villalobos Transferred From Tecos UAG
  Jorge Barrera Transferred From Guadalajara
  Emilio Mora Transferred From San Luis F.C.
  Johan Rodríguez Transferred From Monarcas Morelia
  Jorge Almirón Transferred From León

Out:
  Diego Torres Transferred To N.A.
  Oscar Carrasco Transferred To Monarcas Morelia
  Raymundo Montalvo Transferred To N.A.
  Angel Velázquez Transferred To N.A.
  David Fierros Transferred To N.A.
  Edder de Anda Transferred To N.A.
  Jose Alamo Transferred To N.A.
  Alfredo Jauregui Transferred To N.A.
  Juan de la Cruz Transferred To N.A.
  Eduardo Gomez Transferred To N.A.

San Luis F.C. 

In:
  Irenio Soares on loan From Club América
  Reinaldo Navia on loan From Club América
  Miguel Zepeda on loan From Santos Laguna
  Frausto Mendoza on loan From ???
  Oscar Mascorro on loan From Puebla

Out:
 Ariel González on loan To UNAM
 Emilio Mora on loan To Querétaro
 Jesús Mendoza on loan To Atlante
 Héctor Altamirano on loan To Monarcas Morelia
 Ignacio Torres returned To Club América

Santos Laguna 

In:
  Francisco Torres - transferred from Club América
  Oribe Peralta - on loan from C.F. Monterrey
  Joaquín Reyes - returns from CD Veracruz
  Walter Jiménez - transferred from Jaguares de Chiapas
  Eliomar Marcón - transferred from Tecos UAG
  Emilio Damian Martinez  transferred from Olimpia de Paraguay

Out:
  Vicente Matías Vuoso transferred to Club América
  Rafael Medina transferred to Tecos UAG

Tecos UAG 

In:
  Rafael Medina Transferred From Tecos UAG
  Hugo Droguett Transferred From U. de Chile
Out:
  Eliomar Marcón Transferred To Santos Laguna
  Juan Pablo Rodríguez Transferred To CD Guadalajara
  Mario Rodríguez Transferred To Club Atlas
  Alejandro Villalobos Transferred To Querétaro F.C.
  José Alfredo Castillo Transferred To N/A

Tigres UANL 

In:
  Mario Méndez on loan from Club Toluca
  Javier Restrepo transferred from Cruz Azul
  Tomás Campos on loan from Cruz Azul
  Emmanuel González on loan from Cruz Azul
  Rolando Zárate on loan from Vélez Sársfield
  Luis Fernando Saritama'from Club Deportivo QuitoOut:  Nestor Silvera released
  Carlos Morales on loan to Club Toluca
  Antonio Sancho on loan to UNAM
  Rogelio Rodriguez on loan to UNAM
  Javier Saavedra on loan to Jaguares
  Eduardo Rergis on loan to Atlante F.C.
  Sixto Peralta transferred to Racing Club de Avellaneda
  Júlio César Santos transferred to Olympiacos

 Club Toluca In:  Pablo Granoche return From CD Veracruz
  Bruno Marioni transferred From UNAM Pumas
  Carlos Morales on loan From UANL Tigres
  Juan Osuna on trial From free
  Edgar "Quesos" Gonzalez  called up From Atletico Mexiquense
  Rigoberto Esparza  called up From Atletico MexiquenseOut:  Israel López transferred To Cruz Azul
  Rodrigo "Rengo" Diaz returned To Lanús

 UNAM In:  Ariel López on loan From Necaxa
  Antonio Sancho on loan From UANL Tigres
  Rogelio Rodríguez on loan From UANL Tigres
  Ariel Gonzalez on loan From San Luis
  Ignacio Scocco transferred From Newell's Old Boys
  Reinaldo on loan From Grêmio Portoalegrense
  Alex Diego return From Jaguares de ChiapasOut:  Bruno Marioni transferred To CD Toluca
  Gerardo Galindo transferred To C.D. Necaxa
  Joaquin Beltran transferred To C.D. Necaxa
  Joaquin Botero transferred To San Lorenzo de Almagro
  Julio Pinheiro transferred To Kyoto Purple Sanga
  Cesareo Victorino To N/A
  Raúl Salinas return To Club América

 CD Veracruz In:  Cirilo Saucedo - signed from Dorados de Sinaloa
  Ivan Estrada - signed from Dorados de Sinaloa
  Jaime Ruíz - signed from Dorados de Sinaloa
  Hugo García - signed from Dorados de Sinaloa
  David Mendoza - signed from Dorados de Sinaloa
  Alonso Sandoval - signed from Chivas de Guadalajara
  Marinho Ledesma - signed from Pachuca
  Tressor Moreno - signed from Necaxa
  Hector Mancilla - signed from Colo-Colo
  Israel Damonte - signed from Gimnasia y Esgrima de Jujuy
  Mauricio Victorino - signed from Defensor Sporting
  Oscar Razo - signed from Irapuato
  Enrique Badillo - signed from Pachuca
  Hugo Chávez - signed from Puebla
  Carlos Zamora - signed from Monterrey
  Martin Arzuaga - signed from Juniors de BarranquillaOut:  Mario Rosales - returns to Tecos UAG
  Martín Calderón - transfer to Atlante
  Pablo Granoche - returns to CD Toluca
  Joaquín Reyes - returns to Santos Laguna
  Hiber Ruíz - returns to Coatzacoalcos
  Gustavo Biscayzacu - transfer to Atlante
  Pablo Quattrocchi - to N/A
  Rodrigo Valenzuela - to N/A
  Oscar Rojas - transfer to Jaguares
  Manuel Vidrio -to N/A
  Francisco Bravo - transfer to''' Tecos UAG''

Trans
Mexico
Lists of Mexican football transfers